Piz Lagrev is a mountain of the Albula Alps, overlooking Lake Sils in the Swiss canton of Graubünden. On its northern side lies the Julier Pass. Reaching a height of 3,165 metres (10,384 feet) above sea level, Piz Lagrev is the culminating point of the range lying between the Septimer Pass and the Julier Pass.

Northeast of Piz Lagrev is a small glacier named Vadret Lagrev and an unnamed lake at its bottom.

References

External links

 Piz Lagrev on Hikr
 Piz Lagrev on Summitpost

Mountains of the Alps
Alpine three-thousanders
Mountains of Switzerland
Mountains of Graubünden
Sils im Engadin/Segl
Surses